These shows premiered in 2018. The premiere dates may have changed depending on a variety of factors.

See also
2018 in American television network changes
2018 deaths in American television
2018 in American television

References

2018 in American television
2018-related lists
Mass media timelines by year